The Acaraú Valley State University (UVA) is a state-operated university located in Sobral, Ceará, Brazil.

External links
 Universidade Estadual do Vale do Acaraú (Portuguese)

Ceara
Education in Ceará